Kisiel may refer to:
 Kissel, a European dessert known as kisiel in Poland
 Kisiel Prize, awarded annually by Polish weekly Wprost to publicists, politicians, and entrepreneurs

People
 Adam Kisiel (1600 – 1653), Polish and Ukrainian politician
 Dominik Kisiel (born 1990), Polish footballer
 Jarosław Kisiel (born 1964), Polish fencer
 Karol Kisel (born 1977), Slovak footballer
 Krzysztof Kisiel (born 1969), Polish handball coach
 Shelby Kisiel (born 1994), American rhythmic gymnast
 Theodore Kisiel (born 1930), American professor of philosophy

See also
 
 Kisel (disambiguation)
 Kisielewski

Polish-language surnames